The IRNE Awards are presented annually by the Independent Reviewers of New England (IRNE) to honor the best achievements in Boston-area theater.

Categories

 Best New Play Small Stage
 Best Set Design Small Stage
 Best Costume Design Small Stage
 Best Lighting Design Small Stage
 Best Projection Design Small Stage
 Best Sound Design Small Stage
 Best Choreography Small Stage
 Best Solo Performance Small Stage
 Ensemble Small Stage
 Best Supporting Actress–Play–Fringe
 Best Supporting Actor–Play–Fringe
 Best Actress–Play–Fringe
 Best Actor–Play–Fringe
 Best Supporting Actress–Play–Midsize
 Best Supporting Actor–Play–Midsize
 Best Actress–Play–Midsize
 Best Actor–Play–Midsize
 Best Supporting Actress–Musical Small Stage
 Best Supporting Actor– Musical Small Stage
 Best Actress–Musical Small Stage
 Best Actor – Musical Small Stage
 Music Director Small Stage
 Best Director–Play–Fringe
 Best Director–Play–Midsize
 Best Director–Musical Small Stage
 Best Musical Small Stage
 Best Play–Fringe
 Best Play–Midsize
 Best Young Performer Small Stage
 Best New Play Large Stage
 Best New Musical Large Stage
 Best Set Design Large Stage
 Best Costume Design Large Stage
 Best Lighting Design Large Stage
 Best Sound Design Large Stage
 Best Projection Design Large Stage
 Best Choreography Large Stage
 Best Solo Performance Large Stage
 Best Ensemble Large Stage
 Best Supporting Actress-Musical Large Stage
 Best Supporting Actor-Musical Large Stage
 Best Actress-Musical Large Stage
 Best Actor-Musical Large Stage
 Best Supporting Actress-Play Large Stage
 Best Supporting Actor-Play Large Stage
 Best Actress-Play Large Stage
 Best Actor-Play Large Stage
 Best Music Director Large Stage
 Best Visiting Production- Large Stage
 Best Visiting Actress Large Stage
 Best Visiting Actor Large Stage
 Best Director-Musical Large Stage
 Best Director-Play Large Stage
 Best Musical Large Stage
 Best Play Large Stage
 Best Young Performer Large Stage

References

External links
 
 
 
 
 
 

American theater awards
Awards established in 1997
Awards for projection designers